WBGN (1340 AM) is an oldies formatted radio station licensed to Bowling Green, Kentucky, United States. The station is currently owned by Forever Communications, Inc. as part of a conglomerate with Glasgow–licensed country music station WLYE-FM (94.5 FM), Auburn–licensed country station WBVR-FM (96.7 FM), and Smiths Grove–licensed  Top 40/CHR station WUHU (107.1 FM). All four stations share studios on Scottsville Road in southern Bowling Green, and its transmitter is located off Church Avenue in the northern part of the city.

To complement its AM signal, WBGN operates a FM translator station on 94.5 FM under the callsign W233CZ. That station's transmitter is shared with the AM signal.

History
The station's construction permit, which was initially filed in July 1958, was granted by the Federal Communications Commission on May 18, 1959, and the station first signed on the air on November 24 of that same year. The FCC granted the official license on May 31, 1960. It was originally owned by J. Paul Brown and Robert L. Proctor, doing business as Bowling Green Broadcasting Company. The station broadcast originally broadcast a Rock format, then it began broadcasting a country format, but switched to a Top 40/CHR format. From 1964 until 1982, WBGN was the original flagship station of Western Kentucky Hilltoppers football and basketball games of the Hilltopper Sports Radio Network, with Wes Strader and Bud Tyler (originally from WLBJ) making the play-by-play commentary on those broadcasts. This included the basketball team's 1971 Final Four appearance.

WBGN's format changed from Top 40/CHR to Top 40 Oldies, in 1985. In April 1988, WBGN was purchased by Hilltopper Broadcasting, another locally based radio broadcasting firm, which at the time owned Smiths Grove-licensed WBLG-FM (now WUHU), and switched back to a country music format. However, the station switched back to Top 40 Oldies in 1990, this time broadcasting the music from a satellite service called "The Oldies Channel". This format lasted until Forever Communications purchased the station, and converted it into a Sports radio station by affiliating WBGN with ESPN Radio.

The station affiliated with Fox Sports Radio after WWKU and WCDS became the ESPN Radio affiliates.

In December 2016, WBGN launched low-powered FM repeater W300DA, broadcasting at 107.9 MHz, to bring WBGN's programming to the FM dial. In February 2017, WBGN's Fox Sports Radio affiliation ended when both WBGN-AM and W300DA became a simulcast of Glasgow-based WLYE-FM, a Classic Country music station in the area.

In December 2019, WBGN's simulcasting with WLYE was suspended to stunt with Christmas music until December 30, 2019, whem WBGN dropped its Christmas music stunt and flipped to oldies as "AM 1340 & 107.9 FM WBGN" with the slogan "Good Times, Great Oldies", thus returning the Oldies format back to the station and the entire Bowling Green radio market area.

Programming
WBGN's simulcast with WLYE was not full-time. WBGN still retains the rights to certain sporting events. It is also the local affiliate for the U of L Sports Network broadcasting Louisville Cardinals football and basketball, as well as the National Hockey League's Nashville Predators games from the Nashville Predators Radio Network. The station was Kentucky Sports Radio's Bowling Green affiliate until January 2019, when the program moved to WKCT.

Until the end of the 2021 season, WBGN was also the official local broadcaster for Bowling Green Hot Rods baseball. Those broadcasts moved to WKCT beginning with the 2022 season.

References

External links

BGN
Oldies radio stations in the United States
Mass media in Bowling Green, Kentucky
Radio stations established in 1959
1959 establishments in Kentucky